Thura Myint Maung was the Minister for Religious Affairs of Myanmar (Burma). He is a retired Brigadier General in the Myanmar Army. He resigned on 16 January 2013.

References

Government ministers of Myanmar
Burmese military personnel
People from Magway Division
1941 births
Living people
Union Solidarity and Development Party politicians